List of authors of South African botanical taxa is a list of authors who have named South African plants and the standard abbreviations used for those authors in the botanical literature.

The entry for each author is given on a single line showing their name, dates and other names by which they have been known. Following this comes a list of the major groups they have worked on, separated by commas, and finally the standard form for their name (in bold).

The major groups are 
S - Spermatophytes/Phanerogams (flowering plants and gymnosperms)
M - Fungi and Lichens (Mycology)
A - Algae
P - Pteridophytes
B - Bryophytes
F - Fossils
L - Pre-Linnaean (from ')
C - Cryptogamic (from ')

The dates given are those of birth and death where one or both are available. If neither is known, a date on which the author is known to have published a name (usually the earliest if more than one is known) is given preceded by 'fl.' (floruit).

See also
 List of botanists by author abbreviation
 International Code of Nomenclature for algae, fungi, and plants

References

Further reading

External links 
 Wikispecies catalogue of taxon authorities

 

South African